Vision 2000 was a program created by the citizens of Chattanooga, Tennessee in the mid-to-late 1980s. It was envisioned as a process to visualize the city in the year 2000 by working to reverse the effects decades of major industrialization had had on the city by reversing both air and water pollution. The program also sought to establish businesses and parks that would attract tourists to the city.

History
Chattanooga was one of the country's major industrial cities in the 1950-1960s. This led to a large amount of pollution and toxic chemicals being released into both the air and the surrounding Tennessee River. The pollution levels in the city became so high, that it was announced to be the ‘Dirtiest City in America’ by Walter Cronkite in a news broadcast in October 1969. Many citizens of Chattanooga began to seek refuge from the smog and haze by moving their families up on Lookout Mountain, but there were several concerned members of the town who insisted on creating a plan to revitalize Chattanooga.

In the 1980s, a group of citizens established Vision 2000.  Their plan was to use the river as a way to reinvent the city by creating parks and businesses that overlooked its views.  They also started work on the Tennessee Aquarium, which was created to complement the river and its ecosystem.

Aquarium 
The Chattanooga Riverwalk and the Aquarium were together part of a “Tennessee River Park Master Plan” designed in 1985.  In 1986, work was begun on the Riverwalk, a seven-mile path winding from the Chickamauga Dam to Downtown Chattanooga that would make the Tennessee river accessible to everyone.  Parks, fishing piers, and businesses along the Riverwalk created additional income for the city, while simultaneously allowing the public access.  The Tennessee Aquarium was opened in 1992.  It featured exhibits that walked a person through the Tennessee River, allowing visitors to experience the river firsthand.  The aquarium was the first major tourist attraction for Chattanooga.

Walnut Street Bridge 

In 1993, the Walnut Street Bridge was reopened to the public.  The bridge opened in 1891, and had been the main route between the north and south sides of the city.  Due to safety problems, however, it was closed in 1978, and the decaying bridge had sat unused for decades.  It was part of Vision 2000 to reopen the bridge and make it for pedestrians only.  The bridge was rebuilt throughout the 1980s, and still stands today as one of the longest walking bridges in the world.

Awards and Accolades. 
Chattanooga received a vast amount of positive feedback during the 1990s. It was named one of the Most Enlightened Cities in America by Utne Reader, one of the World's Greatest Cities by NPR's Morning Edition, and one of the Country's Best Places to Live, Work, and Play by Outdoor Magazine. Chattanooga Vision was also awarded the 6th annual History Makers Award by the Chattanooga History Center in 2011.

References

External links
Series from the Chattanooga Times and Free Press detailing the rise, fall, and aftermath of Vision 2000

Urban development